Walter Outram (born 1 June 1855, date of death unknown) was a Barbadian cricketer. He played in one first-class match for the Barbados cricket team in 1871/72.

See also
 List of Barbadian representative cricketers

References

External links
 

1855 births
Year of death missing
Barbadian cricketers
Barbados cricketers
People from Saint Philip, Barbados